Eva is an unincorporated community in Ritchie County, in the U.S. state of West Virginia.

History
A post office called Eva was established in 1894, and remained in operation until 1950. An early postmaster named the community after his daughter, Eva Gill.

References

Unincorporated communities in Ritchie County, West Virginia
Unincorporated communities in West Virginia